Jiaozhi arquebus (Giao Chỉ arquebus or Vietnamese arquebus) refer to several type of gunpowder firearms produced historically in Vietnam. This page also include Vietnamese muskets — since the early definition of musket is "heavy arquebus". The term Jiaozhi arquebus comes from Chinese word Jiao Chong (交銃, lit. 'Jiaozhi Gun'), a generalization of firearms originating from Dai Viet.

History 
Đại Việt used to have a relatively early tradition of using gunpowder weapon, perhaps imported from the Ming Dynasty. At the end of the 14th century, king Po Binasuor of Champa died in battle when he was hit by hand cannon of the Trần army while he was surveying on the Hải Triều River. Until the Hồ dynasty, Hồ Nguyên Trừng manufactured Thần Cơ Sang cannon. By the time of Lê Sơ, gunpowder weapons began to be widely used in the army. In Thailand, a gun was discovered that was originally believed to have originated in China, but based on the inscriptions on the gun they confirmed its Đại Việt origin. This is most likely a relic of the invasion of the Lanna kingdom (present day Chiang Mai) under Lê Thánh Tông in 1479–1484.

By the 16th century, when Europeans came to Đại Việt to trade, Western weapons were purchased by lords to equip their armies and muskets began to be imported into Đại Việt ever since. Tomé Pires in his Suma Oriental (1515) mentioned that Cochin China has countless musketeers and small bombards. Pires also mentioned that very much gunpowder is used in war and for amusement. The Đại Việt muskets were not only widely used domestically, but also introduced into the Ming dynasty after the border conflicts between the Mạc dynasty and ethnic minority groups in Guangxi and Yunnan.

Malay and Trịnh Vietnamese soldiers used bamboo covers in their matchlock arquebus barrel and bound them with rattan, to keep them dry when marching in the rain. Vietnamese people also had a smaller piece of bamboo to put over the barrel, to prevent the gun from accumulating dust when it was placed on a weapon rack. The Vietnamese used such arquebus to harass a Spanish fleet off shore in the late 16th century with some success. This gun is similar in form to an istinggar, but has longer buttstock.

The Jiaozhi arquebus is not only highly appreciated by the Chinese, but also praised especially by Western observers for its high accuracy in what they saw in the Lê-Mạc and Trịnh-Nguyễn wars. The Ming dynasty also rated Đại Việt arquebus as "the best gun in the world", even surpassing the Ottoman gun, the Japanese gun and the European gun. According to Li Bozhong, former head of the history department at Qinghua University:At the end of the Ming Dynasty, the Annam people developed a matchlock gun with excellent performance, which the Chinese called "Jiao Chong" (交銃, meaning Jiaozhi gun). Some people think that this kind of gun is superior to the Western and Japanese "Niao Chong" (鳥銃, Bird gun) and "Lu Mi Chong" (魯密銃, Rûm arquebus) in terms of power and performance.Liu Xianting, who lived at the end of the Ming dynasty, commented:"Jiaozhi matchlock is the best of the world"Đại Việt gun can penetrate several layers of iron armor, can kill from 2 to 5 people with one bullet but does not emit loud sound when fired. Qing-era record, 南越筆記 (Nányuè bǐjì) linked the Vietnam arquebus with Java arquebus.

In the late 17th century AD, Trịnh army used long muskets, with a barrel length between 1.2 to 2 meters, resulting in heavier weight. They were carried on man's back and fired 124 g shot. To fire it requires a stand, made from a piece of wood from 1.83–2.13 m long.

A gun similar to gingal, with wooden stand and swivel is also reported:"One end of the carriage is supported with 2 legs, or a fork of 3 foot high, the other rests on the ground. The gun is placed on the top, where there is an iron socket for the gun to rest in, and a swivel to turn the muzzle in any way. From the breech of the gun there is a short stock for the man who fires the gun to transverse it withal, and to rest it against his shoulder ..."Even in the late 18th century, Nguyễn musketeers relied on long matchlocks mounted in swivels and three-legged stands.

See also 

 Java arquebus
 Istinggar
 Tanegashima (gun)
 Elephant gun

References

Further reading 

 Charney, Michael (2004). Southeast Asian Warfare, 1300-1900. BRILL. 

Early firearms
15th-century military history
Weapons of Vietnam